Boris Režek (2 October 1908 – 26 July 1986) was a Slovenian cross-country skier. He competed in the men's 18 kilometre event at the 1928 Winter Olympics.

References

1908 births
1986 deaths
Slovenian male cross-country skiers
Olympic cross-country skiers of Yugoslavia
Cross-country skiers at the 1928 Winter Olympics
Skiers from Ljubljana